The Cantons of Bourges City are 4 cantons situated in the Cher département and in the Centre-Val de Loire region of France. Each canton covers a part of the commune of Bourges.

Population

See also 
 Arrondissements of the Cher department
 Communes of the Cher department

References

Bourges